Álvaro García de Zúñiga (born 1958) is a  Uruguayan-born Portuguese playwright, poet and composer from Montevideo.   Notable plays include  Teatro Impossível, O Teatro é Puro Cinema, Sur Scène et Marne, Lecture d'un texte pour le Théâtre and Conferência de Imprensa.

See also
List of Portuguese composers

References

Portuguese composers
Portuguese male composers
1958 births
Living people
People from Montevideo